The dwarf inanga (Galaxias gracilis) is a galaxiid of the genus Galaxias, found in the North Island of New Zealand.

It is a landlocked galaxiid present in only eleven lakes on the west coast of the North Island within 50 km of Dargaville, and in Lake Ototoa on the South Kaipara Head, where it was introduced in 1986. It can reach a maximum length of around 6.2 cm.

References

  Listed as Vulnerable (VU A1ce, B1+2 cd, D2 v2.3)
 
 
 NIWA June 2006
 Distribution and conservation status of the dwarf inanga Galaxias gracilis (Teleostei: Galaxiidae) an endemic fish of Northland dune lakes
 DOC New Zealand non-migratory galaxiid fishes recovery plan 200313
 Creating and destroying species: the ‘new’ biodiversity and evolutionarily significant units among New Zealand's galaxiid fishes N. Ling1,*, D. M. Gleeson2, K. J. Willis1,†, S. U. Binzegger

Galaxias
Endemic freshwater fish of New Zealand
Taxa named by Bob McDowall
Fish described in 1967